Yoshimi Nishigawa (西側よしみ, born April 8, 1953) is a retired Japanese swimmer who won ten gold medals at the Asian Games in 1970 and 1974. A versatile swimmer, she competed at the 1968, 1972 and 1976 Olympics in three events at each games and reached the final on five occasions. She married the Olympic rower Takashi Murayama.

References

1953 births
Living people
Olympic swimmers of Japan
Swimmers at the 1968 Summer Olympics
Swimmers at the 1972 Summer Olympics
Swimmers at the 1976 Summer Olympics
Japanese female freestyle swimmers
Japanese female backstroke swimmers
Japanese female breaststroke swimmers
Japanese female medley swimmers

Asian Games gold medalists for Japan
Medalists at the 1970 Asian Games
Medalists at the 1974 Asian Games
Asian Games medalists in swimming
Swimmers at the 1970 Asian Games
Swimmers at the 1974 Asian Games